Intizar Hussain (21 December 1925 – 2 February 2016) was a Pakistani writer of Urdu novels, short stories, poetry and nonfiction. He is widely recognised as a leading literary figure of Pakistan. He was among the finalists of the Man Booker Prize in 2013. As someone born in Indian Subcontinent who later migrated to Pakistan during 1947 Partition, a perennial theme in Hussain's works deals with the nostalgia linked with his life in pre-partition era. Intizar Husain is often described as possibly the greatest living Urdu writer.

Literary work 
He wrote short stories, novels and poetry in Urdu, and also literary columns for Dawn newspaper and Daily Express newspaper. The Seventh Door, Leaves and Basti are among his books that have been translated into English. Among the five novels he wrote – Chaand Gahan (1952), Din Aur Daastaan (1959), Basti (1980), Tazkira (1987), Aage Samandar Hai (1995) – Basti received global praise. His other writings include Hindustan Se Aakhri Khat, Aagay Sumandar Hai, Shehr-e-Afsos, Jataka Tales, Janam Kahanian and Wo Jo Kho Gaye. Aagay Sumandar Hai (Sea is facing you in the front) contrasts the spiraling urban violence of contemporary Karachi with a vision of the lost Islamic realm of al-Andalus in modern Spain. His novel Basti is based on Pakistani history.
Among his books, "Basti" and "khali pinjra" have been translated into Persian by Samira Gilani.

Death 
On 2 February 2016 he died at National Hospital, Defence Housing Authority at Lahore on 2:45 p.m, after contracting pneumonia. The Indian Express termed him the "best-known Pakistani writer in the world" after Manto.

Influences 
Hussain believed that two forces had risen in contemporary Pakistan: women and the mullahs. He also acknowledged his study and the influence of Buddhist texts and the Mahabharata.

Legacy 
In 2016, Pakistan Academy of Letters (PAL) announced the ‘Intizar Hussain Award’ which would be given to a literary figure every year.

Accolades and international recognition 
In 2007, Hussain received the Pakistani civil award Sitara-i-Imtiaz (Star of Excellence) by the President of Pakistan. In 2013, he was shortlisted for the Man Booker International Prize after Frances W. Pritchett translated his Urdu novel Basti into English. He received a lifetime achievement award at the Lahore Literary Festival. Newsweek Pakistan called him "Pakistan's most accomplished living author" in 2014. In September of the same year, Hussain was made an Officer of the Ordre des Arts et des Lettres by the French government. He was also the first ever winner of the prestigious Premchand Fellowship awarded by Sahitya Akademi of India in 2007.

Bibliography
 A Chronicle of the Peacocks: Stories of Partition, Exile and Lost Memories
The Death of Sheherzad
Basti (1979)
Chiraghon Ka Dhuvan (memoir) (1999)
Chaand Gahan (2002)
Ajmal-I Azam (2003)
Surakh Tamgha (2007)
Qissa Kahanian (2011)
Justujoo Kya Hai (autobiography) (2012)
Apni Danist Mein (2014)

References

External links 
 Column archive

1925 births
2016 deaths
People from Bulandshahr district
Muhajir people
Pakistani dramatists and playwrights
Pakistani scholars
Recipients of Sitara-i-Imtiaz
Pakistani Sunni Muslims
Writers from Lahore
Recipients of the Adamjee Literary Award